Matthew Guise-Brown (born 13 September 1991) is a South African field hockey player. He competed in the 2020 Summer Olympics.

Personal life
Guise-Brown is also a coach, working as a PE teacher at St. Anthony's School for Boys in North London.

Honours

International
2015 Men's African Olympic Qualifier – The top scorer

References

External links
 
 
 
 
 

1991 births
Living people
Sportspeople from Pietermaritzburg
Field hockey players at the 2020 Summer Olympics
South African male field hockey players
Olympic field hockey players of South Africa
South African expatriate sportspeople in England
Expatriate field hockey players
Male field hockey defenders
Men's England Hockey League players
Hampstead & Westminster Hockey Club players
Alumni of Maritzburg College
University of Pretoria alumni
Field hockey players at the 2022 Commonwealth Games
21st-century South African people